Denmark participated at the 2018 Summer Youth Olympics in Buenos Aires, Argentina from 6 October to 18 October 2018.

The Danish team was announced on 18 September 2018.

Athletics

Boys
Track & road events

Cycling

Denmark qualified a boys' and girls' combined team based on its ranking in the Youth Olympic Games Junior Nation Rankings.

Team

Fencing

Denmark qualified one athlete based on its performance at the 2018 Cadet World Championship.

Individual

Mixed continental team

Golf

Individual

Mixed team

Gymnastics

Artistic
Denmark qualified one gymnast based on its performance at the 2018 European Junior Championship.

 Girls' artistic individual all-around – vacated

Karate

Denmark qualified one athlete based on the rankings in the Buenos Aires 2018 Olympic Standings.

Rowing

Denmark qualified one boat based on its performance at the 2017 World Junior Rowing Championships.

Shooting

Individual

Team

Triathlon

Denmark qualified one athlete based on its performance at the 2018 European Youth Olympic Games Qualifier.

Individual

Relay

References

2018 in Danish sport
Nations at the 2018 Summer Youth Olympics
Denmark at the Youth Olympics